The 1916 Cockermouth by-election was held on 2 March 1916.  The by-election was held due to the resignation of the incumbent Liberal MP, Sir Wilfrid Lawson, 3rd Baronet, of Brayton.  It was won by the Liberal candidate Joseph Bliss, who was unopposed.

References

1916 elections in the United Kingdom
1916 in England
20th century in Cumberland
By-elections to the Parliament of the United Kingdom in Cumbria constituencies
Unopposed by-elections to the Parliament of the United Kingdom (need citation)
March 1916 events